Brian Grainger is an American ambient/techno/electronic music composer and record label owner.  The majority of his musical projects have been published under the names Milieu, Coppice Halifax, and Brian Grainger.  Other musical aliases of his include 'Pink Space', 'Vhom', 'Parallax', 'Phe_', 'Teenager', 'AQV', 'TMA3', 'Troth', and 'Bike'.  His collaborative projects include the bands CH*/CN (with EOD), Waterstrider (with Jonathan Canupp), Free Festival (with Brian Ellis), VCV (with David Tagg), SEAS (with David Tagg), Viking Destroyer (with David Tagg), Flax Harmonade (with Lee Batchelor), Silver Honey (with Jason Adams), Gauss (with Eric Adrian Lee), Royal Opium (with Lee Norris), Sunbeam Rail (with Samuel Campbell) and The Blue Spaces (with Luke Hazard).

Grainger is the sole owner and operator of the record label Milieu Music (established 2004) and its sub-label Recycled Plastics (est. 2011).  Music released for these labels is produced in Grainger's home studio, Botany Bay, located in South Carolina. Grainger is also co-founder and co-owner of the record labels Second Sun Music and Install, along with David Tagg.

Eufloria video game soundtracks
Grainger (as Milieu) created the soundtrack to the ambient videogame Eufloria, which was released on PC, MAC, PlayStation Network, IoS, Android, and Steam.  Through the Eufloria soundtrack, Grainger's music has reached nearly 450,000 gamers by December 2012 and over 500,000 gamers by March 2013.  The sequel Eufloria Adventures (available on PlayStation Mobile from April 2014) also features a soundtrack by Grainger, this time under the moniker 'Coppice Halifax'.

Other soundtracks and scores
Grainger composed an original score for the Discovery Channel documentary Into The Dragon's Lair, a special about Nile crocodiles. Into the Dragon's Lair aired on Animal Planet in 2010.  As Milieu, Granger's song "Cropduster" was features in the third season of the online show Radar.  Milieu also contributed the song "Luke's Rusty Drum" to Code Barre, a short film  produced with the National Film Board of Canada. Grainger's psychedelic track "Swamp Bike" was given a video by Mindbomb Films, and subsequently featured on Gizmodo and Boing Boing:

Selected discography

References

External links
 Milieu Music
 Milieu discography at Discogs
 Coppice Halifax discography at Discogs
 Brian Grainger discography at Discogs
 ‘A Course In Dying’ Interview, January 10, 2018

1983 births
Living people
American male composers
21st-century American male musicians
Ambient musicians
Experimental rock musicians
Psychedelic rock musicians
Musicians from South Carolina
Musicians from Columbia, South Carolina